John Stax (born John Edward Lee Fullagar, 6 April 1944, Crayford, Kent) is an English musician best known as original bassist for the Pretty Things.  He adopted the name "Stax" because of his fondness for the music produced by Stax Records.

He played on all of their charting singles, which included "Rosalyn," "Don't Bring Me Down," "Road Runner," and "Cry to Me." He also frequently  contributed backing vocals as well as harmonica performance. He played on the Pretty Things' first three albums: The Pretty Things, Get the Picture? and Emotions, although his exact contributions to the latter are unknown.  He also played on the band's first two EPs, The Pretty Things and Rainin' in My Heart. Stax left the band in January 1967, a month after rhythm guitarist Brian Pendleton. Stax emigrated to Australia in 1970 where he currently resides.
Stax currently builds and sells cigar box guitars. He rejoined the Pretty Things on their 2012 Australian tour, taking the stage on a couple of songs to play bass guitar and harmonica.

Stax also played with Melbourne R&B 'supergroup' Blues Hangover, which featured Dave Hogan (vocals, harp), Warren Rough (guitar) and Ken Farmer (drums; all from The Paramount Trio) plus Peter Wells (Rose Tattoo) and Lucy De Soto. The band's passionate, gritty brand of R&B; was heard to good effect on two albums issued on the Dog Meat label, Blues Hangover (1995) and Roadrunner (1996).

References

External links
 On AllMusic
 
 Black Diamond Cigar Box Guitars

1944 births
Living people
People from Crayford
English rock bass guitarists
English rock singers
British harmonica players
Pretty Things members
English expatriates in Australia